Thiotricha leucothona is a moth of the family Gelechiidae. It was described by Edward Meyrick in 1904. It is found in Australia, where it has been recorded from New South Wales.

The forewings are shining white, with a faint ochreous tinge and with the costal edge dark fuscous towards the base. There is a crescentic wedge-shaped fuscous tornal mark reaching halfway across the wing and there are two rather suffused dark fuscous oblique streaks from the costa towards the apex. There is also a black apical dot, preceded by some fuscous suffusion. The hindwings are light grey.

References

Moths described in 1904
Taxa named by Edward Meyrick
Thiotricha